James Logan (October 20, 1674October 31, 1751) was a Scots-Irish colonial American statesman, administrator, and scholar who served as the fourteenth mayor of Philadelphia and held a number of other public offices.

Logan was born in the town of Lurgan in County Armagh, Ireland to Ulster Scots Quakers. He served as colonial secretary to William Penn. He was a founding trustee of the College of Philadelphia, the predecessor of the University of Pennsylvania.

Life

James Logan was born at Lurgan, County Armagh, on October 20, 1674. His parents were Patrick Logan (1640–1700) and Isabella, Lady Hume (1647–1722), who married in early 1671, in Midlothian, Scotland.  His father had a Master of Arts degree from the University of Edinburgh, and originally was an Anglican clergyman before converting to Quakerism, or the Society of Friends. Although apprenticed to a Dublin linen draper, he appears to have received a good classical and mathematical education, and to have acquired a knowledge of modern languages not common at the period. The War of 1689–91 obliged him to follow his parents, first to Edinburgh, and then to London and Bristol, England where, in 1693, James replaced his father as schoolmaster. In 1699, he came to the colony of Pennsylvania aboard the Canterbury as William Penn's secretary. Logan is described as "tall and well-proportioned, with a graceful yet grave demeanor. He had a good complexion, and was quite florid, even in old age; nor did his hair, which was brown, turn grey in the decline of life, nor his eyes require spectacles."

Later, he supported proprietary rights in Pennsylvania and became a major landowner in the growing colony; he was also a slave-owner. Logan advanced through several political offices, including clerk (1701), commissioner of property (1701), receiver general (1703), and member of the provincial council (1703). In 1717 Logan's mother came to live with him in Philadelphia.  She died on January 17, 1722, at his family home, Stenton.

In 1722 he was elected mayor of the City of Philadelphia. During his tenure as mayor, Logan allowed Irish Catholic immigrants to participate in the city's first public Mass. He later served as the colony's chief justice from 1731 to 1739, and in the absence of a governor of Pennsylvania, became acting governor from 1736 to 1738. As acting governor, he opposed Quaker pacifism and war tax resistance, and encouraged pacifist Quakers to give up their seats in the Pennsylvania Assembly so that it could make war requisitions. On October 9, 1736, he responded to requests from Native American leaders to control the sale of alcohol, which was creating serious social problems, by prohibiting the sale of rum in indigenous communities, but as the penalty was only a fine of ten pounds and the law was poorly enforced, it did not have a significant effect.

During his tenure as acting governor, Logan played an active role in the territorial expansion of the colony. Whereas William Penn and his immediate successors had pursued a policy of friendly relations with the Leni Lenape (Delaware) peoples, Logan and other colony proprietors (notably the indebted brothers John, Richard and Thomas Penn) pursued a policy of land acquisition. Such efforts to expand were spurred by increased immigration to the colony and fears that the New York Colony was infringing on Pennsylvania's northern borders in the Upper Delaware river valley. In addition, many proprietors (including Logan and the Penn brothers) had engaged in extensive land speculation, selling off lands occupied by the Lenape to new colonists before concluding an official treaty with the tribe.

As part of his efforts to expand Pennsylvania, Logan signed the Walking Treaty of 1737 (commonly referred to as the Walker Purchase) with the Lenape, forcing the tribe to vacate lands in the Upper Delaware and Lehigh valleys under the auspices of the tribe having committed to sell the lands to William Penn in 1686—a treaty whose ratifying document is considered by some sources to have been a fabrication. Under the terms of the treaty, the Lenape agreed to cede as much territory as a man could walk in one and one-half days to the Pennsylvania colony; however, Logan used the treaty's vague wording, the Lenape's unclear diplomatic status, and a heavily influenced (scouts were sent ahead to clear the path of the runners selected to represent the colony) "walk" to claim a much larger territory than was originally expected by the Lenape. Meanwhile, Logan negotiated (in advance) with the powerful Iroquois Confederacy to allow for the treaty to take place. As a result, the Iroquois (nominally the diplomatic overlords and protectors of the Lenape people) rebuffed Lenape attempts to have the Iroquois intervene on their behalf. The net result of the Walking Treaty was an increase in the colony's size of over 1,200,000 acres, the scattering of the Lenape in a regional diaspora, and the breakdown of diplomatic relations between Pennsylvania and the tribe.

Throughout his life in the colony Logan engaged in various mercantile pursuits, especially fur trading, with such success that he became one of the wealthiest men in the colonies. He wrote numerous scholarly papers published by the American Philosophical Society and European journals. Logan was also a natural scientist whose primary contribution to the emerging field of botany was a treatise that described experiments on the impregnation of plant seeds, especially corn. He tutored John Bartram, the American botanist, in Latin and introduced him to Linnaeus.

His daughter, Sarah, married successful Philadelphia businessman and statesman Isaac Norris.

Logan died in 1751 at Stenton, near Germantown, at the age of 77, and was buried at the site of Arch Street Friends Meeting House (built in 1804).

Colonial Bibliophile 

While Logan would eventually become mayor of Philadelphia, chief justice of the Pennsylvania Supreme Court, lieutenant governor, and acting governor he is perhaps best known for being a bibliophile, confessing once that "Books are my disease". He collected a personal library of over 3,000 volumes. Some commentators consider Logan's library to have been the largest and best collection of classical writings in America at that time.

Logan would in time become known to Benjamin Franklin and his "Junto"; an influential group of friends that would meet weekly and discuss scholarly and political issues.  He became a mentor to Franklin, who published Logan's translation of Cicero's essay "Cato Maior de Senectute". Eventually, the Junto decided to establish a subscription library, a cooperative endeavour where members would pay a fee for use of the library. Franklin and the other members of the Junto considered Logan the "best Judge of Books in these parts" and chose him to select the first 43 titles for the Library Company of Philadelphia.

At the same time Logan was helping to build the collection for the Library Company of Philadelphia, he was adding to his own personal library which was considered substantial in number and breadth. He planned on donating his library for public use after his death and to this end he had a building constructed on Sixth Street in Philadelphia. Upon Logan's death, and after a lengthy delay due to some confusion in his will, through an act of the Pennsylvania Assembly and the governor on March 31, 1792, the 3,953 volumes and other property of the Loganian Library were "vested in the Library Company of Philadelphia, their successors and assigns, for ever, in trust for the support and increase of the said Loganian Library."

The Loganian Library 

The Loganian Library, as he wished it to be called, was diverse.  The catalogue of its final holdings is now lost but a partial inventory done in 1760 reveals a wide selection of books. The book distribution by date reveals nothing out of the ordinary.  Most were from the seventeenth century with 57 percent. Next came those from the eighteenth century at 27 percent.  Finally, there was a good number from the fifteenth and sixteenth centuries at 16 percent. The collection was mostly British and northern European with 33 percent from Britain; the Netherlands, 24 percent; Germany, 17 percent; France, 13 percent; Switzerland, 9 percent; Italy, 2 percent; and others (Scandinavia, Spain, Poland, Russia, America) at 2 percent

The distribution of the books by subject in the 1760 catalogue is equally diverse with history, antiquities, geography, chronology, etc. at 22 percent. Religious subjects of divinity and ecclesiastical history constituted 15 percent.  Scientific subjects such as "physick," "mathematicks", and natural history was at 16 percent. Literary subjects such as orators, poets, fables, romances, etc. at 14 percent with philology at 13 percent. Philosophy, surprisingly, was only 6 percent while arts, liberal and mechanical, "magick," etc. was 3 percent. The remaining subjects were as follows: medicine, surgery, and "chymistry," 2 percent; law, 2 percent; voyages and travels, 1 percent; philosophical history, 1 percent, and miscellaneous, 5 percent.

Logan's library contained many 17th and 16th century classical works such as a 1615 edition of Archimedes' works, the mathematical treatise of Pappus of Alexandria printed in 1660, an Aratus of Soles from 1672, Elzevir's architecture publication of 1649 from Amsterdam, Johann Vossius' De Quatuar Artibus Popularibus published in 1650, and a 1599 edition of astronomy edited by Barthelemy Pitiscus  In one famous episode, Logan was reading a treatise on early astronomy by Johann Fabricius and read that the first printed edition of Greek astronomer Ptolemy's Almagest was printed in Greek in 1538.  Logan was certain that it was released in an earlier Latin version, having sold it and his other books in Dublin before he left in 1699.  Logan wrote Fabricius and politely explained his conviction. In reply, Fabricius reaffirmed his contention and sent his own 1538 copy as proof.  Unconvinced, Logan wrote his agent in London, explaining that he had sold his library to a bookseller who lived on Castle Street and to see if he knew of the book's location.  His agent was successful in finding the book and sent to Logan where it was confirmed that it was a Latin edition of the Almagest published in 1515. Such was the strength of Logan's bibliographic mind as professed by Benjamin Franklin.

Legacy
In Philadelphia, the Logan neighborhood and the landmark Logan Circle are named for him. His 1730 estate "Stenton" (now a National Historic Landmark, operated as a museum) is located in Logan area.

See also 
 Walking Purchase

References

Sources

External links 
 Abstract of his life at GwyneddMeeting.org
 Biography and portrait at the University of Pennsylvania
 Biography at USHistory.org
 An essay by Logan urging support for war requisitions

1674 births
1751 deaths
American people of Scotch-Irish descent
Kingdom of Ireland emigrants to the Thirteen Colonies
Mayors of Philadelphia
Members of the Pennsylvania Provincial Council
Schoolteachers from Bristol
Libraries in British North America
People from County Armagh
People of colonial Pennsylvania
New Latin-language poets
Burials in Pennsylvania
University of Pennsylvania people